Zola may refer to:

People
 Zola (name), a list of people with either the surname or given name
 Zola (musician) (born 1977), South African entertainer
 Zola (rapper), French rapper
 Émile Zola, a major nineteenth-century French writer

Places
 Zola (crater) on Mercury
 Zola, Iran, a village in West Azerbaijan Province
 Zola, Soweto, a township in South Africa
 Zola, a village on the Greek island of Kefalonia

Art, entertainment, and media

Fictional entities
 Arnim Zola, a fictional character in the Marvel Comics universe
 Zola, a character in the Battle Arena Toshinden fighting game series; see List of Battle Arena Toshinden characters
 Zola, a female mercenary and party member in the video game Blue Dragon
 Zola, a villain in the Dick Tracy comic strip; see List of recurring characters in Dick Tracy

TV and film
 Zola (film), an American drama film
 Zola, a planet in the animated video series Macross Dynamite 7
 Zola Grey Shepherd, adopted daughter of Meredith Grey and Derek Shepherd on the television series Grey's Anatomy

Music
 The Zolas, a Canadian rock band
 Zola Jesus, an American singer, songwriter, and record producer

Other uses
 Zola (moth), a genus of moth
 Typhoon Zola, two tropical cyclones in the northwestern Pacific
 Zola (company), an online wedding registry, wedding planner, and retailer

See also 
 Zolaism
 Zolo (disambiguation)